Joannès Marietton (27 August 1860, in Lyon – 27 May 1914) was a French politician. He belonged to the French Section of the Workers' International (SFIO). He was a member of the Chamber of Deputies from 1906 to 1914.

References

1860 births
1914 deaths
Politicians from Lyon
French Section of the Workers' International politicians
Members of the 9th Chamber of Deputies of the French Third Republic
Members of the 10th Chamber of Deputies of the French Third Republic
Members of the 11th Chamber of Deputies of the French Third Republic